Paulo da Palma (born 18 March 1965) is a German-born Portuguese former professional footballer who played as a midfielder.

Career statistics

References

External links
 

1965 births
Living people
Portuguese footballers
Association football midfielders
Bundesliga players
2. Bundesliga players
Eintracht Nordhorn players
VfB Oldenburg players
VfL Osnabrück players
VfL Bochum players
1. FC Saarbrücken players
FC 08 Homburg players
People from Nordhorn
Sportspeople from Lower Saxony